Marta Andrade Vidal (born 17 May 1972) is a Spanish former competitive figure skater. She is an eight-time Spanish national champion and competed in two Winter Olympics, placing 20th in 1994 and 22nd in 1998. She competed in eleven World Championships, achieving her highest placement, 19th, in 2002 in Nagano, Japan.

Andrade lives in Barcelona. She is the main coach at FC Barcelona's figure skating section. She also works as a physiotherapist.

Programs

Results 
GP: Champions Series (Grand Prix)

References

 Skatabase: 1990s Worlds
 Skatabase: 1990s Europeans
 Skatabase: 1990s Olympics
 Skatabase: 2000s Worlds
 Skatabase: 2000s Europeans

External links
 
 
 
 

1972 births
Living people
Spanish female single skaters
Olympic figure skaters of Spain
Figure skaters at the 1994 Winter Olympics
Figure skaters at the 1998 Winter Olympics
Sportspeople from Barcelona
Competitors at the 1999 Winter Universiade